Gol Zard-e Bala (also Romanized as Gol Zard-e Bālā and Gul-i-Zard Bāla; also known as Gol Zard and Gol Zard-e ‘Olyā) is a village in Kuhdasht-e Jonubi Rural District, in the Central District of Kuhdasht County, Lorestan Province, Iran. At the 2006 census, its population was 42, in 9 families.

References 

Towns and villages in Kuhdasht County